"Ain't No Sunshine" is a song by Bill Withers from his 1971 album Just As I Am, produced by Booker T. Jones. The record featured musicians Donald "Duck" Dunn on bass guitar, Al Jackson Jr. on drums and Stephen Stills on guitar. String arrangements were done by Booker T. Jones. The song was recorded in Los Angeles, with overdubs in Memphis by engineer Terry Manning.

The song was released as a single in 1971, becoming a breakthrough hit for Withers, reaching number six on the U.S. R&B Chart and number three on the Billboard Hot 100 chart. Billboard ranked it as the No. 23 song for 1971.

The song reached the Top 40 again in 2009, when it was sung by Kris Allen in the eighth season of American Idol.

History 

Withers was inspired to write the song after watching the 1962 movie Days of Wine and Roses. He explained, in reference to the characters played by Lee Remick and Jack Lemmon, "They were both alcoholics who were alternately weak and strong. It's like going back for seconds on rat poison. Sometimes you miss things that weren't particularly good for you. It's just something that crossed my mind from watching that movie, and probably something else that happened in my life that I'm not aware of."

For the song's third verse, Withers had intended to write more lyrics instead of repeating the phrase "I know" 26 times, but then followed the advice of the other musicians to leave it that way: "I was this factory worker puttering around," Withers said. "So when they said to leave it like that, I left it."

Withers, then 31, was working at a factory making bathrooms for 747s at the time he wrote the song. When the song went gold, the record company presented Withers with a golden toilet seat, marking the start of his new career.  "Ain't No Sunshine" was the first of Withers' three gold records in the U.S.

Originally released as the B-side to another song called "Harlem", "Ain't No Sunshine" was preferred by disc jockeys, and it became a huge hit, Withers' first. "Harlem" was subsequently covered by The 5th Dimension, who featured it on their Soul and Inspiration album and released it as a single.

Withers performed "Ain't No Sunshine" on The Old Grey Whistle Test. It won the Grammy for Best R&B Song in 1972 and is ranked 285th on Rolling Stone's list of the 500 Greatest Songs of All Time.

Charts

Weekly charts

Year-end charts

Certifications

Michael Jackson version 

In 1971, singer Michael Jackson recorded a rendition of Bill Withers' song for his debut album Got to Be There (released in early 1972).

In the UK the song was released as the third (and final) single from the album (after the two singles "Got to Be There" and "Rockin' Robin", a cover of Bobby Day's 1958 song). The song "I Wanna Be Where You Are", which was released as the third single in the US, was on the B-side. It was a hit, peaking in the UK Singles Chart at number 8 for 3 weeks in September 1972. The song was remixed by Benny Blanco for the 2009 release The Remix Suite. The song's drum break was sampled in "Gonna Love Me" by Teyana Taylor from her second studio album K.T.S.E..

Charts

Other charted versions
The Polish rock band Budka Suflera recorded a cover version of the song in 1974 under the title "Sen o dolinie", with Krzysztof Cugowski providing the lead vocal. The single also appeared on their 1983 compilation album "1974-1984" released by Polskie Nagrania Muza. The Polish lyrics were written by Adam Sikorski. It peaked at number 14 on Poland's LP3 chart in 1983

In November 1991, Australian pop band Rockmelons, (featuring vocalist Deni Hines) released a version as the lead single of their second studio album, Form 1 Planet (1992). The version peaked at number five and was certified Gold in Australia. It also peaked at number eight in New Zealand.

The Nylons version was released in 1998 and reached number 53 on the Canadian Adult Contemporary chart. A South African male choral group Ladysmith Black Mambazo recorded its own version featuring vocalist Des'ree for their studio album In Harmony (1999). As a single, the version peaked at number 42 in the UK.

A heavy metal band Black Label Society covered the song entitled "Ain't No Sunshine When She's Gone" for their 2013 album Unblackened. As a single, the version peaked at number 42 on the Canadian Rock Chart.

References

1971 singles
1971 songs
Bill Withers songs
Grammy Hall of Fame Award recipients
Motown singles
Songs written by Bill Withers
Sussex Records singles
Festival Records singles
Mushroom Records singles
Universal Music Group singles
1972 singles
1991 singles
1999 singles
Songs about heartache